is a 1986 action-platform video game originally developed by Wolf Team and published by Telenet Japan for the MSX, PC-8801 and X1 home computers. It was later ported to FM-7 and PC-9801 computers, while an almost completely reworked version was also released for the Family Computer, followed by remakes for the Sega Mega Drive/Genesis and PC Engine Super CD-ROM², and a version for mobile phones as well. It is the first entry in the eponymous series. It stars a Japanese schoolgirl teenager named Yuko Asou, summoned into becoming the Valis warrior by wielding the titular mystical sword to protect Earth, the spirit realm and the dream world Vecanti from demon lord Rogles. Through the journey, the player explores and search for items and power-ups, fight enemies and defeat bosses to increase Yuko's maximum health and attributes.

Programmers Masahiro Akishino and Osamu Ikegame began planning on a side-scrolling action game featuring a customed delinquent heroine, an idea originated from Sukeban Deka, to compete in a contest sponsored by Japanese computer magazine LOGiN. Tentatively titled Shoujo Furyou Densetsu, the project was kept secret within Telenet until the company learned about its existence but continued as their next release. However, development was discontinued after a Telenet superior came to inspect and expressed disliking towards the graphics, ordering writer Hiroki Hayashi to take action and fix the project, leading to the conception of Valis. Akishino and Hayashi used Ikegame's work on Shoujo Furyou Densetsu as a basis to introduce their own story and character ideas, which were based on an unfinished personal novel Hayashi wrote prior to development and used as reference for the plot and worldview. Hayashi was responsible for the designs of Yuko and Reiko Kirishima, both of whom were main characters in his novel.

Valis sold well, being listed as one of the top three best-selling games in 1987 rankings. However, critical reception has varied depending on the version; the original MSX release was met with mixed response, with critics praising the audiovisual presentation, cinematic cutscenes and frenetic gameplay but criticism was geared towards its difficulty. The Genesis remake carried average sentiments from gaming publications, with comments regarding its slow pacing, short length, low difficulty and repetitive gameplay. The enhanced PC Engine Super CD remake was received more favorably from reviewers, but its lack of additional options and occasionally unresponsive controls were seen as negative points. The game was supplemented with manga adaptations, an anime short by Sunrise, albums from King Records and Wave Master,  and doujinshi books. It was followed by Valis II (1989), Valis III (1990), and Valis IV (1991).

Gameplay and premise 

Valis: The Fantasm Soldier is an action-platform game starring Yuko Asou, a Japanese schoolgirl teenager who is fated to protect three different realms – the Earth, the land of spirits, and the dream world Vecanti. The demon lord Rogles extinguishes a light, which acts as a source of power for the inhabitants of Vecanti. In a desperate plea for salvation, its queen Valia reaches out for a brave soul who can help them in their time of despair, with Yuko being the one who answers the call. Yuko is magically summoned into becoming the Valis warrior by wielding the titular sword to liberate Vecanti from the evil of Rogles. Yuko's classmate Reiko Kirishima is brainwashed by Rogles into helping him try and put an end to the Valis warrior.

Its gameplay varies depending on the platform but each one retains the same basic plot; in the original MSX, PC-8801 and X1 versions, as well as the FM-7 and PC-9801 ports, Valis is a side-scrolling game where the player controls Yuko to fights through each level's enemies while jumping across ledges, exploring and searching for items and power-ups, before confronting a boss at the end of each level to increase Yuko's maximum health and attributes. At certain points in the game, gameplay pauses, and cinematic cutscenes play regarding the game's storyline. The Family Computer version differs considerably from the other versions, being more of a side-scrolling action role-playing game, with larger maze-style levels composed of multiple paths, resulting in a more difficult game due to the lack of password or save feature.

The Mega Drive/Genesis remake exhibits a gameplay system more similar to later games in the Valis series, particularly Valis III; the d-pad moves the main character and the three fire buttons allows Yuko to perform three actions: sliding, jumping, and swinging her sword that can be upgraded in three stages and there are alternative firing modes. The player can also use magic spells, gaining them after defeating bosses. The PC Engine Super CD-ROM² remake features improvements to the gameplay system (such as single high jumps instead of two-phase jumps and the sliding move damaging enemies) and voiced cutscenes. The mobile phone version further added new stages and alternate costumes.

Development 
Valis: The Fantasm Soldier was developed over the course of half a year by Wolf Team (later renamed Namco Tales Studio), an internal gaming subsidiary of Telenet Japan founded in 1986, best known for their work in the Tales franchise. It was co-produced and co-written by Hiroki Hayashi and Yukio Mitsuhashi, with Masahiro Akishino providing additional scenario support and serving as programmer of the PC-8801 version. Hayashi also acted as conceptual designer and art director. Tomoki Anazawa and Masayasu Yamamoto served as main programmers for the MSX and X1 versions respectively. The soundtrack was composed by Shinobu Ogawa. Hayashi recounted the project's creation process and history on his personal website, while Yamamoto provided additional development commentary in a 2007 interview.

Hayashi and Yamamoto explained that Akishino and programmer Osamu Ikegame started planning on a project tentatively titled Shoujo Furyou Densetsu, a side-scrolling action game featuring a customed delinquent heroine, who would have served as a vehicle to showcase the action. Hayashi and Yamamoto claimed that the idea originated from Sukeban Deka, particularly the live-action television adaptation, as both Akishino and Ikegame were fans of the series. Hayashi revealed that the project was made as an entry for "Program Olympics", a contest sponsored by Japanese computer magazine LOGiN where each game developer creates software to compete, being kept secret within Telenet until the company eventually learned about its existence but development continued as their next release.

Yamamoto stated that he had been planning to make Final Zone Wolf before being switched to Shoujo Furyou Densetsu due to staff shortage, while Hayashi joined the staff after development of Final Zone Wolf had finished, helping by making various settings and drawing character artwork of the unnamed main protagonist. Hayashi recalled one day that a Telenet superior came to the development room to inspect the situation and expressed disliking towards the graphics due to the limited number of on-screen colors. Both Hayashi and Yamamoto claimed that the project was discontinued and Ikegame later quit his job at Telenet. Hayashi was surprised after his superior suddenly ordered him to take action in order to fix the project and had the image of a girl fighting with a magical sword, leading to the conception of Valis: The Fantasm Soldier on the spot.

Yamamoto recalled that Akishino and Hayashi used the project Ikegame was creating as a basis to introduce their own story and character ideas, with Hayashi being responsible for the designs of Yuko and Reiko. Hayashi stated that the idea for Valis was based on an unfinished personal novel he wrote prior to development, revolving around the light and darkness of the human heart, and featured Yuko and Reiko as main characters. He used his novel as reference for the game's plot and worldview, which was written in parallel to the making of Shoujo Furyou Densetsu. At the start of development, Yamamoto calculated the number of needed tiles for each level, reckoning that using 32x32 sprites would require 1024 tiles for stage maps and began making his own data under this assumption. Yamamoto also remembered telling a Telenet sales staffer that they should be able to scrolls the large maps, commenting that sales team at the time always wanted to use a program's size and character sprites as a marketing ploy, with Telenet investing effort into the title. For the X1 version, the team drew special artwork to let users know a wrong disk was inserted.

Release 
Valis: The Fantasm Soldier was first published in Japan for the MSX by Telenet Japan on November 26, 1986. It was followed by conversions for the PC-8801 and X1 computers on December of that year, as well as ports for the FM-7 and PC-9801 platforms in 1987. These versions were handled by Wolf Team. Telenet would later develop an almost completely reworked version of Valis for the Family Computer, published only in Japan by Tokuma Shoten on August 21 of the same year. In December 1991, a remake of Valis for the Sega Mega Drive/Genesis was developed and published in Japan by Riot, an internal gaming division of Telenet. This version features character artwork by Osamu Nabeshima. Telenet also released the game through its subsidiary Renovation Products in North America. A European release was planned by UbiSoft, as part of a multi-game licensing deal with Renovation, but it was never officially released in the region for unknown reasons. An enhanced remake for the PC Engine Super CD-ROM² was also developed and published by Riot on March 19, 1992. This version introduced voice acting, with Yuko Asou being voiced by Sumi Shimamoto.

The original MSX and PC-88 versions, as well as the Genesis and PC Engine Super CD-ROM remakes, were first re-released in digital form for Microsoft Windows through D4 Enterprise's Project EGG service and the i-Revo store front respectively. The game was included alongside its sequels as part of the Valis: The Fantasm Soldier Complete compilation for Windows, published by Sunsoft in 2004 under a limited run of 2000 copies, which came bundled with a bonus CD and a figure. In 2011, D4 Enterprise re-released the compilation with two additional titles as Valis: The Fantasm Soldier Complete Plus, which came bundled with a CD soundtrack instead. In 2005, Bandai Networks collaborated with developer R-Force Entertainment to produce a version of Valis: The Fantasm Soldier for Yahoo! Keitai-compatible mobile phones, published through SoftBank's S!Appli service on May 18. The PC Engine Super CD remake was also made available by Konami as part of the "PC Engine Archives" line on the PlayStation Network in 2010, and was given away for free to Japanese PlayStation Plus subscribers in 2014.

In 2021, the media company Edia announced reprints of Valis and its two sequels for the PC Engine to commemorate the series' 35th anniversary. The PC Engine remake and its two follow-ups were re-released physically and digitally as part of Valis: The Fantasm Soldier Collection for the Nintendo Switch in Japan by Edia on December 9, 2021. The physical edition of the collection is also planned for an English localization by Limited Run Games. This version was later re-released separately through the Nintendo eShop by Edia first in Japan on February 10, 2022, and later in Europe and North America in March 2022. The Genesis remake was included as part of the Renovation Collection 1 compilation for Evercade, launched in 2022 by Blaze Entertainment, and is currently planned to be included along with the MSX version as part of Valis: The Fantasm Soldier Collection II for Switch.

Other media 
The release of Valis: The Fantasm Soldier was supplemented by a manga adaptation in Tokuma Shoten's Wanpaku Comic magazine that ran between September and October 1987, written and illustrated by Susumu Kobayashi. To promote the Family Computer version, a three-minute anime short by Sunrise, directed by Hideaki Anno and Katsuhiko Nishijima, featuring music by Kohei Tanaka, was included in the November 1987 issue of the VHD magazine Anime Vision. It also received an album containing the original soundtrack and other Telenet Japan titles, distributed in Japan by King Records in 1988. Valis was one of several video games adapted by Kouta Hirano into a manga titled Go ahead!! Shizuoka Cyber Research Department, published by Shinseisha as part of their Gamest Comics collection on April 25, 1999. Hayashi also published three doujinshi books between 2007 and 2008 at Comiket under the pseudonym "PiXEL". In 2011, another album containing orchestral arrangements of the game's soundtrack was released by Wave Master.

Reception 

Valis: The Fantasm Soldier garnered mixed reception from critics, most of which reviewed the MSX version as an import title, since its initial release. Japanese publication MSX Magazine gave high praise to its graphics, character sprites, music and playability. French magazine Micro News regarded it as a strange game, noting its characters and setting, as well as the frenetic but stressful gameplay. Arcades Laurence Le Gentil found it to be a poorly designed and difficult game, criticizing the jerky movement, language barrier and enemy sprites for being "almost transparent", but commended its fast-pacing and music. Micromanías José Miguel Rodríguez gave positive remarks to the game's backgrounds for their graphical quality, addictive nature and originality, noting its increasing difficulty curve and recommending it for "those who are able to enjoy shooting frantically for hours", but criticized its repetitive sprites.

Reviewing for the Spanish magazine MSX Club, the group MSX Boixos Club gave it a high recommendation for its audiovisual presentation, smooth movement and addiction factor. Echoing a similar opinion as MSX Magazine, MSX Gids Alfred Debels and José Herps praised the visuals, sound and overall quality. In contrast, MSX Club Magazines Jan van Roshum liked its visuals but lambasted the game's difficult nature. The Family Computer version received an 18.17 out of 30 score in a public poll taken by Family Computer Magazine. In a retrospective outlook, Hardcore Gaming 101s Sam Derboo wrote that the original versions "might be a horrible, unplayable mess, but its call to fame to begin with wasn't the gameplay, but the pioneering in cinematic cutscenes - two years even before Ninja Gaiden. (...) What's left is the quite excellent chiptune music, really the only part the original Valis is worth being remembered for". Derboo further described the Family Computer version as a "typical Famicom action RPG - competently executed, but super obfuscate and endlessly frustrating."

According to programmer Masayasu Yamamoto, Valis sold "very well" and was listed as one of the top three best-selling games in 1987 rankings.

Mega Drive/Genesis 

The Sega Mega Drive/Genesis remake of Valis: The Fantasm Soldier carried the same average sentiments as the original release from Japanese and Western gaming publications, some of which also reviewed it as an import title. It also received scores of 19.22 out of 30 and 4.909 out of 10 in public polls taken by Mega Drive Fan and the Japanese Sega Saturn Magazine respectively. Famitsus four reviewers felt that this port more closely followed the Family Computer version.  Consoles + Kaneda Kun found it to be a competent conversion, commending the overall presentation, graphics, animations, music and longevity, but felt mixed regarding its slow playability. Joysticks Olivier Prézeau gave it a more mixed outlook, citing its slow action and short length. Video Games Andreas Knauf expressed mixed feelings regaring the game's graphical quality and criticized the sound effects, but highlighted its soundtrack in a positive manner. Sega Forces Adrian Pitt bashed its "dull and repetitive" gameplay and declared the following: "High graphical content, low playability level. That's Valis in a nutshell."

Sega Visions regarded it as a fun game, citing its large bosses and cinematics. They also praised the audiovisual presentation, but felt it lacked the depth and challenge compared to other action games, and noted that the slow movement of both Yuko and her enemies may alienate experienced players. Aktueller Software Markts Heinrich Stiller gave positive remarks to the colorful visuals and audio, but criticized its jerky scrolling, slow pacing and low difficulty. GamePros Abby Normal gave high remarks to the Genesis release for its graphics, sound, controls and fun. Sega Pro wrote that "it's not worth bothering with this cart (...). If you must, dig it out for a laugh." An editor for the Japanese gaming book Mega Drive Taizen gave an overall negative retrospective outlook to the Mega Drive version for its slow pacing, the character's short attack range, graphics and drastically different characteristics compared to the original release, but the music was positively commended. Sam Derboo of Hardcore Gaming 101 opined that "Valis on the Genesis isn't a bad game, definitely leagues above the original, but still not particularly enjoyable. It's just so slow and boring."

PC Engine Super CD-ROM² 

The PC Engine Super CD-ROM² remake of Valis: The Fantasm Soldier received more favorable response from reviewers. It ranked at the number 119 spot with a 22.82 out of 30 score in a public poll taken by PC Engine Fan as well. Consoles + Jimmy H. and Spirit commended the presentation for its animated cutscenes, graphics, Yuko's animations and soundtrack, but criticized the lack of additional gameplay options, underdeveloped backgrounds and issues with the jumping mechanic for interfering with combat. Génération 4s Philippe Querleux praised the visuals and soundtrack but criticized Yuko's occasionally unresponsive controls and slow movement. Jean-Marc Demoly of Joystick and Joypad co-writer Jean-François Morisse gave positive remarks for its audiovisual presentation and controls.

IGNs Lucas M. Thomas placed it as number six among his top ten list of TurboGrafx titles not released on the Virtual Console, writing that "If you're the kind of gamer who likes to know the exact color of panties being worn by your platforming hero girls, Valis is where you want to invest your time." Retro Gamers Rory Milne highlighted it as "arguably the best" entry in a "great series". According to Sam Derboo from Hardcore Gaming 101, "by its mechanics and level design, it is no doubt the most well-executed game in the entire series. It's still a bit too derivative and pedestrian to be counted among the genre greats like Castlevania and Ninja Gaiden, but at least very, very high second tier."

Legacy 

Valis: The Fantasm Soldier spawned a series of three sequels released during the fourth generation of video game consoles:  Valis II (1989), Valis III (1990), and Valis IV (1991). In addition to the main games, an eroge visual novel spin-off titled Valis X was developed by Eants and released in 2006 on the 20th anniversary of the series, being the last game published by Telenet Japan. It is divided into five episodes that retell the stories of the first four titles, containing copious amounts of lesbian acts and tentacle erotica. Outside  of video games, a four-volume Valis manga series by the artist ZOL was published by Kill Time Communication and featured in the seinen manga magazine Comic Valkyrie between 2007 and 2012. An homage to the series, titled Violet Wisteria, is being developed by KaniPro Games and planned for a 2023 launch on Steam.

Notes

References

External links 

 Valis: The Fantasm Soldier at GameFAQs
 Valis: The Fantasm Soldier at Giant Bomb
 Valis: The Fantasm Soldier and its remakes at MobyGames

1986 video games
Action video games
Bandai Namco games
Fantasy video games
FM-7 games
LGBT-related video games
MSX games
NEC PC-8801 games
NEC PC-9801 games
Nintendo Entertainment System games
Platform games
PlayStation Network games
Sega Genesis games
Sharp X1 games
Side-scrolling platform games
Single-player video games
Telenet Japan games
Sunrise (company)
Tokuma Shoten games
TurboGrafx-CD games
Valis (video game series)
Video games developed in Japan
Video games featuring female protagonists
Windows games
Wolf Team games